Eliphalet is a Biblical Hebrew masculine name. It may refer to:

People 
 Eliphalet Adams (1677–1753), American minister
 Eliphalet Austin, businessman with the Connecticut Land Company
 Eliphalet Ball (1722–1797), American Presbyterian minister
 Eliphalet Wickes Blatchford (1826–1915), American businessman and manufacturer
 Eliphalet Williams Bliss (1836–1903), American manufacturer and inventor
 Eliphalet Adams Bulkeley (1804–1872), American businessman
 Eliphalet Chapin (1741–1807), American furniture maker
 Eliphalet Dyer (1721–1807), American statesman and judge 
 Eliphalet Frazer Andrews (1835–1914), American painter 
 Eliphalet Lockwood (1741–1814), American Revolutionary War militiaman and politician 
 Eliphalet Lockwood (deacon) (1675–1753), American politician and deacon from Connecticut
 Eliphalet Oram Lyte (1842–1913), American educator, author, and textbook creator
 Eliphalet S. Miner (1818–1890), American politician from Wisconsin
 Eliphalet Nott (1773–1866), President of Union College from 1804 to 1866
 Eliphalet Pearson (1752–1826), American educator; acting President of Harvard University
 Eliphalet Remington (1793–1861), gunsmith and founder of Remington Arms
 Eliphalet Stone (1825-1905), American politician from Wisconsin
 Eliphalet Trask (1806–1890), American politician from Massachusetts
 Eliphalet Wickes (1769–1850), member of the United States House of Representatives from New York

Biblical figures
 Eliphalet, son of King David

See also
 Eliphalet Austin House
 Eliphalet Ferris House
 Eliphalet W. and Catherine E. Jaquish Purdy House
 Eliphalet Spurr House

Hebrew masculine given names